Acanthuroidei , is a clade of ray finned fishes which is a suborder of the Acanthuriformes, although it is regarded as a suborder of the Perciformes, the largest order of fish. The suborder includes the surgeonfish and Moorish idol. Members of this suborder have a compressed body covered with small ctenoid scales. The name for the suborder comes from that of the surgeonfish (Acanthuridae) family within it, and is derived from the Greek words akantha and oura, which loosely translate to "thorn" and "tail", respectively, referring to the "scalpels" found on surgeonfishes' caudal peduncle.

Timeline of genera

References

 

 
Ray-finned fish suborders
Articles which contain graphical timelines